Canal+ Sport is a French TV channel devoted to sports programming and is part of the "Les Chaînes Canal+" themed channels of Canal+.

History
Canal+ Vert launched on 31 August 1998, on satellite and cable as a programme multicast of Canal+ sports programmes.

As part of the creation of the Canal+ Bouquet (later, "Les Chaînes Canal+" ) the channel changed its name on 1 November 2003 to Canal+ Sport.

On 20 April 2005, Canal+ Sport presented to the CSA to obtain a frequency on TNT. The application having been selected, the CSA assigned a frequency on the multiplex R3 pay DTT issued as early as 21 November 2005.

Since 8 June 2010, it has started to broadcast its programmes in high definition (HD).

Sports Coverage

Association football 
 Ligue 1
 Ligue 2
 Championat National
 Premier League
 Division 1 Women
 UEFA Women's Champions League
 Eredivise
 A-League (only in Africa)
 CONEMBOL Libertadores

Motorsport 
 Formula E
 IndyCar
 Moto GP
 Formula 1
 WRC

Rugby 
 Top14
 Super Rugby
 The Rugby Championship
 SANZAAR
 World Rugby Sevens Series

Aquatics 

 FINA World Aquatics Championships

Athletics 
 IIAF Diamond League

Basketball 
 FIBA Basketball World Cup
 EuroBasket
 EuroBasket Women
 National Basketball Association (NBA)

Boxing 
Premier Boxing Championship

Salling 
 SailGP

Ice hockey 
 National Hockey League (NHL)
 World Championship (2021-2025)
 Champions Hockey League

Golf 
 Ryder Cup
 The Open
 Us Open
 The Masters
 PGA Championship
 PGA Tour
 PGA European Tour
 World Golf Championships

See also
 Canal+
 Canal+ Séries
 Canal+ Family
 Canal+ Cinéma
 Canal+ Décalé

External links
 Official Website

Sport
Television stations in France
Television channels and stations established in 2003
2003 establishments in France
Sports television networks in France